Kathryn Campbell (born August 8, 1990) is a Canadian karateka. She won the silver medal in the women's kumite -55 kg event at the 2019 Pan American Games held in Lima, Peru. She also won the silver medal in this event at the 2015 Pan American Games held in Toronto, Canada. In both events Valéria Kumizaki of Brazil won the gold medal.

In June 2021, she competed at the World Olympic Qualification Tournament held in Paris, France hoping to qualify for the 2020 Summer Olympics in Tokyo, Japan. She did not qualify as she was eliminated in her first match by Trinity Allen of the United States. In November 2021, she competed in the women's 55 kg event at the World Karate Championships held in Dubai, United Arab Emirates.

She competed in the women's kumite 55 kg at the 2022 World Games held in Birmingham, United States.

Achievements

References

External links 
 

Living people
1990 births
Place of birth missing (living people)
Canadian female karateka
Sportspeople from New Brunswick
Pan American Games medalists in karate
Pan American Games silver medalists for Canada
Karateka at the 2015 Pan American Games
Karateka at the 2019 Pan American Games
Medalists at the 2015 Pan American Games
Medalists at the 2019 Pan American Games
Competitors at the 2022 World Games
21st-century Canadian women